Timothy Grant Perry (born 1 August 1988) is a retired New Zealand rugby union player who played as a prop for  in New Zealand's domestic Mitre 10 Cup, the  and the Blues in the international Super Rugby competition.

Despite many injuries across his career, Perry was selected for New Zealand in 2017, playing 8 games for the All Blacks.

Early career

The son of former All Black Grant Perry, Tim was born in the town of Ashburton and raised on a nearby farm.   He moved to Christchurch to complete his secondary school education where he was a boarder at St. Andrew's College.   He played first XV rugby for St. Andrew's and after graduation won the Christchurch Colts competition playing for the Christchurch club and represented  at under-19 level in 2007.

His breakthrough into top level rugby was delayed due to a focus on other commitments, notably his job as a shepherd on his family's farm, however he began to make a name for himself playing for Mid Canterbury in the 2010 Heartland Championship.   He was nominated for the Heartland player of the year award and made the team of the season.

For 2011 he moved to Marlborough to play club rugby for Harlequins and as a result of his good form, he gained selection for 's B side.

Senior career

Perry was part of the Tasman team that won the Mitre 10 Cup for the first time unbeaten in 2019 playing his 70th and final game for the Mako in the final.

Super Rugby

A strong first season at provincial level with Tasman saw Perry named in the  squad for the 2013 Super Rugby season.  He started 7 games in what was to be his only year in Auckland as his franchise endured a difficult season, winning only 6 of 16 games to finish 10th on the overall log.

Moody's return from injury in 2015 in addition to the emergence of wider training group loosehead Alex Hodgman relegated Perry down to fourth choice number 1 and as a result, he only made a solitary substitute appearance during the campaign.   However, he was still highly thought of in Crusaders country and was included in the franchise's wider training group for 2016 despite having suffered a season-ending injury playing for the Tasman Makos in 2015.   After missing out on 2016, new Crusaders head coach, Scott Robertson promoted Perry back to the 'Saders senior squad for 2017.

International

Perry was a New Zealand Schools representative in 2006.

Despite limited game time for the Crusaders in 2017 due to established All Blacks Joe Moody and Wyatt Crockett being regulars in the 1 and 17 jerseys, Perry was called up to the All Blacks for the 2017 end-of-year tour after an outstanding provincial campaign with Tasman and injuries to Moody and Kane Hames. Perry made his debut off the bench, replacing the now-recovered Hames in the match against the Barbarians in Twickenham on 4 November 2017, which was a 31–22 win. Perry is the 20th All Black to be a son of a former All Black. Perry also started for the All Blacks 10 days later, playing a solid shift in the 28–23 win against a French XV before being replaced by debutant Atunaisa Moli, however both of these matches do not count as official test matches.

Perry was included in the All Blacks squad for the France test series, but he failed to make his official test debut due to a hamstring injury. Perry was replaced in the squad, by fellow newcomer Karl Tu’inukuafe, as the All Blacks won the series 3–0.

Perry recovered from injury in time for the Super Rugby playoffs, in good form. This form from Super Rugby allowed Perry to play his first test for New Zealand on 18 August 2018 against Australia, during the 2018 Rugby Championship. Perry replaced Crusaders team-mate Joe Moody in the 53rd minute of the test and had a fine performance against Australia, who were beaten by the All Blacks by 38–13.

Perry made a further four test appearances during the Rugby Championship, in the injured Moody's absence. Perry replaced Karl Tu'inukuafe off the bench in all of them. Perry's highlight of the competition was on 29 September, against Argentina, where himself and All Black debutant Angus Ta'avao performed extremely well against the opposition's scrum. Perry's outstanding scrum performance lead to a 35–17 win over Argentina, securing the Rugby Championship trophy for New Zealand.

In the final round of the Rugby Championship, Perry didn't perform as well. Perry replaced Karl Tu'inukuafe against South Africa's Springboks, in the 46th minute, but missed a crucial tackle on Springbok captain Siya Kolisi, only a few minutes after coming on, leading to a try to South African midfielder Damian de Allende. Perry was eventually subbed off the field in the 70th minute, for a concussion test, which was failed. Tu'inukuafe came back onto the field for Perry, who missed out on the final minute, when Perry's Crusaders team-mate Richie Mo'unga kicked the winning conversion, leading to a narrow 32–30 win.

Having broken his arm during the 2019 Super Rugby season, Perry was not considered for national selection due to injury in 2019, missing out on the World Cup.

Career honours

Tasman

ITM Cup Championship – 2013
Mitre 10 Cup Premiership – 2019

Crusaders
Super Rugby – 2017
Super Rugby – 2018

References

1988 births
Living people
New Zealand rugby union players
Rugby union props
Mid Canterbury rugby union players
Tasman rugby union players
Blues (Super Rugby) players
Crusaders (rugby union) players
Rugby union players from Ashburton, New Zealand
People educated at St Andrew's College, Christchurch
New Zealand international rugby union players